Hendrik de Grijff (22 September 1892 – 11 December 1976) was a Dutch sports shooter. He competed in the 600 m free rifle event at the 1924 Summer Olympics.

References

External links
 

1892 births
1976 deaths
Dutch male sport shooters
Olympic shooters of the Netherlands
Shooters at the 1924 Summer Olympics
People from Zutphen
Sportspeople from Gelderland